JOJ may refer to:
 Doris Lake Aerodrome, an ice runway in Nunavut, Canada
 Jack Off Jill, an American rock band
 John Owen-Jones (born 1971), Welsh musical theatre actor and singer
 Johnnie O. Jackson (born 1971), American bodybuilder
 TV JOJ, a Slovak television channel